Lohre or Løhre is a surname. Notable people with the surname include: 

Günther Lohre (1953–2019), German athlete
Julie Lohre (born 1974), American fitness competitor
Olaf Løhre (1877–1957), Norwegian politician

See also
Loher (disambiguation)
Lohr (surname)